Grant Elmer Heckenlively (August 29, 1916 – October 12, 1985) was an American football player and coach. He served as the head football coach at his alma mater, the University of South Dakota, in 1945, compiling a record of 0–4.

Head coaching record

References

External links
 

1916 births
1985 deaths
American football centers
South Dakota Coyotes football coaches
South Dakota Coyotes football players